The Puerto Rico Grand Prix, was the name of two unconnected motor races held in Puerto Rico just over 40 years apart.

The 1950s and 1960s saw a series of sports car races held after the European season at the end of the year in the Caribbean and the USA centred on the big dollar speedweek of races in Nassau in the Bahamas. The Grand Prix Societe de Puerto Rico held an expansion to the Nassau season on the Antilles Auto Racing Circuit, near Caguas over two weekends in November 1962 with the main event held on November 11. The race was won dominated by Roger Penske in his controversial Zerex special. Penske won the 246 kilometre race by three laps ahead of Timmy Mayer in a Cooper Climax and factory Porsche racer Dan Gurney in a Porsche 718 WRS.

The long-running American Trans-Am Series stage a Puerto Rico Grand Prix in 2003 in what was a one-off visit to the island territory. Jorge Diaz promoted the event which was held on a temporary circuit on runway, taxiways and support roads of San Juan's Isla Grande Airport. Jorge Diaz, Jr. climbed from a rear of grid penalty into the top three, but the win went to another local driver Jaguar driver Wally Castro ahead of Bobby Sak and Tomy Drissi. A planned 2004 race was cancelled.

Winners of the Puerto Rico Grand Prix

See also
 Grand Prix de Ponce
 Cuban Grand Prix
 Bahamas Speed Week

References 

Sports car races
National Grands Prix
Grand Prix